Kim Chan-Hee  (born 25 June 1990) is a South Korean footballer who plays as a centre  forward for Dangjin Citizen FC in the K3 League. He Joined K League 1 team Pohang Steelers in 2012–2013.

References

External links 

1990 births
Living people
Association football forwards
South Korean footballers
Pohang Steelers players
Daejeon Hana Citizen FC players
Bucheon FC 1995 players
K League 1 players
K League 2 players
Hanyang University alumni